Events from the 1680s in Canada.

Events
 1682: Robert Cavelier, sieur de la Salle reaches the mouth of the Mississippi River and claims the entire Mississippi Valley for France, naming the area Louisiana.
 1682: William Penn's treaty with the Delaware begins a period of friendly relations between the Quakers and Indians.
 1683: After the death of Louis XIV's brilliant minister, J. B. Colbert, France's interest in the colonies wanes.
 c. 1685: In North America, the English and French vie for control.
 1685: LaSalle lands at Matagorda Bay, builds Fort St. Louis.
 1686: Mackinac region, Rooseboom and McGregor open trade but are seized by the French.
 1686: De Troyes and D'Iberville capture three English posts on James Bay (June–July).
 1686: King James II and Louis XIV sign neutrality pact handing forts of St. John's and Port Royal back to the French.
 1689-1697: King William's War (American counterpart of the War of the Grand Alliance in Europe) -- Abenakis, Penobscot, other New England tribes, attacked by English and their Iroquois allies. This is the first of the French-English wars for control of North America, continuing to 1763. During these wars, the Iroquois League generally sides with the English, and the Algonquian tribes with the French.
 1689: Nicolas Perrot formally claims upper Mississippi region for France.
 1689, 5 August: A raiding party of 1,500 Iroquois warriors kill 72 French settlers at Lachine in an event known as the Lachine massacre.

See also

Former colonies and territories in Canada
Timeline of the European colonization of North America
History of Canada
List of years in Canada

References